The 1987 NCAA Division II women's basketball tournament was the sixth annual tournament hosted by the NCAA to determine the national champion of Division II women's  collegiate basketball in the United States.

New Haven defeated two-time defending champions Cal Poly Pomona in the championship game, 77–75, claiming the Chargers' first NCAA Division II national title. 

The championship rounds were contested at the Springfield Civic Center in Springfield, Massachusetts, hosted by Springfield College.

Regionals

East

Great Lakes

New England

North Central

South

South Atlantic

South Central

West

National Finals - Springfield, Massachusetts
Visiting team listed first and date March 14 in Elite Eight unless indicated

Final Four Location: Springfield Civic Center Host: Springfield College

All-tournament team
 Joy Jeter, New Haven
 Niki Bracken, Cal Poly Pomona
 Michelle McCoy, Cal Poly Pomona
 Charlene Taylor, New Haven
 Jill Halapin, Pitt Johnstown

See also
 1987 NCAA Division I women's basketball tournament
 1987 NCAA Division III women's basketball tournament
 1987 NAIA women's basketball tournament
 1987 NCAA Division II men's basketball tournament

References
 1987 NCAA Division II women's basketball tournament jonfmorse.com

 
NCAA Division II women's basketball tournament
1987 in sports in Massachusetts